Spin, sometimes stylized as SPiN, is a 2015 short film drama directed by Noah Workman and written by Wilson Cleveland, who also stars. The film takes place over the course of a contentious live television interview between a Wall Street executive played by Hartley Sawyer and a financial journalist played by Cleveland.

Reception 
The film received a 2016 Webby Award honor for Individual Short (Drama) and generally favorable reviews from critics. In his March 6, 2015 IndieWire review, Joseph Ehrman-Dupre called SPiN a "sharp, smart satire" with writing "full of "spitfire one-liners" and NewMediaRockstars' Evan DeSimone credited the writing as being "Sorkin-esque in the best sense of the word." Tubefilter writer Sam Gutelle complained while "Wall Street corruption is a well-tread topic," SPiN is "A smart, twisty take on the world of high finance and media distortion."

Cast 

 Wilson Cleveland as James Locke
 Hartley Sawyer as Scott Angelus
 Andrew Jernigan as Entrepreneur
 Lewis Raymond Taylor as Lewis
 Ronnie Flynn as Entrepreneur
 Prophecy Onasis as Proph
 Bastiano Farran as Guest actor
 Jordan Alexander King as King Komm.

References

External links 

 SPiN – official website
 
 

2015 films
American business films
Films about financial crises
Films set in New York City
Wall Street films
2010s American films